Phylloctenium is a genus of flowering plants belonging to the family Bignoniaceae.

Its native range is Madagascar.

Species
Species:

Phylloctenium bernieri 
Phylloctenium decaryanum

References

Bignoniaceae
Bignoniaceae genera